The Fixer is a journalistic comic on the Bosnian War, written by Joe Sacco. It tells the story of a Sarajevan man who, having lost everything else in the war, sells his stories to Western journalists. It was published in 2003. Time listed it as one of the Best Comics of 2003.

See also 
Siege of Sarajevo
Fax from Sarajevo
Sarajevo Tango
Le Sommeil du monstre

References
Sacco, Joe (2003). The Fixer, Drawn & Quarterly. .

Comics by Joe Sacco
Drawn & Quarterly titles
Non-fiction graphic novels
Siege of Sarajevo in comics

Fictional Yugoslav people
Fictional Bosnian people
Bosnian War in comics
Siege of Sarajevo in non-fiction